Ernie Lazar (born Ernest Clayton Jammes; April 16, 1945 – November 1, 2022) was an American researcher and a prolific Freedom of Information Act petitioner who amassed a "vast digital and documentary archive of government records on political extremists," used by many scholars, who regarded him as a "hero of researchers."

Background
Ernie Lazar was born Ernest Clayton Jammes on April 16, 1945, in Minneapolis, Minnesota, to Marjorie Jammes and an unknown father.  His mother allowed the Lazar family to adopt him in Chicago.  Lazar majored in history at the California State College at Hayward (now California State University, East Bay) but did not graduate.

Career
As a teenage freelance researcher, he read the monthly FBI Law Enforcement Bulletin.  At one point, he read how US Federal Bureau of Investigation director J. Edgar Hoover contradicted a John Birch Society supporter’s letter regarding the Communist Party USA.  Hostile responses led to a lifelong interest in right-wing conspiracy theories.

For his day job, Lazar worked in the music industry as record promoter, disc jockey, and record store owner in San Francisco.  He helped promote "Born to Be Alive" by Patrick Hernandez in 1979.  Later, he worked more than two decades for the State of California's Board of Registered Nursing, Department of Motor Vehicles, and Office of the Secretary of State of California.  Lazar received mention in Billboard  on June 11, 1977, for his music store "Disco Central" and its unique disco collection in the San Francisco Bay area.

For his night job and over his lifetime, Lazar filed more than 9,000 Freedom of Information Act (FOIA) requests.  He amassed a "600,000-page online and paper library — stored at his home and in a warehouse."  The Center for Right Wing Studies at the University of California, Berkeley, received a grant from the Southern Poverty Law Center to digitize some files, while Lazar crowdsourced for funding himself.

Less than a year before his death, Lazar wrote to the Las Vegas Sun regarding the FBI and the John Birch Society:     In September 2022, Lazar made an unusual public announcement, which included acknowledgement of his nearing death for "renal disease."  For reading, he recommended David Corn's American Psychosis: A Historical Investigation of How the Republican Party Went Crazy (2022) and Matt Dallek's BIRCHERS: How the John Birch Society Radicalized the American Right (2023).

Death
Ernie Lazar died from kidney disease at his home in Palm Springs, California, on November 1, 2022. He was 77, and had no immediate family.

Legacy
Before his death, Lazar estimated that more than 3 million people worldwide had mined his various online archives.

"'Over the past 30 years, literally no one has made greater use of the Freedom of Information Act than Ernie Lazar,' David J. Garrow, the Pulitzer Prize-winning biographer and historian, said."

"To a generation of authors, researchers, academics and others, Mr. Lazar was a figure of heroic proportions. Through sheer perseverance and patience, Mr. Lazar became a kind of Zen master of the Freedom of Information Act, or FOIA, a provision enacted in 1967 that allowed the public a centralized way to request unclassified government material."

Books citing Lazar as a source include: 
 Church and State in the Modern World: A Critical Assessment and Annotated Bibliography (2005)
 The Dangers of Dissent: The FBI and Civil Liberties since 1965 (2010)
 Subversives: The FBI's War on Student Radicals, and Reagan's Rise to Power (2012)
 Surveillance in America: Critical Analysis of the FBI, 1920 to the Present (2012)
 Black Terror White Soldiers: Islam, Fascism & the New Age (2013)
 Wrapped in the Flag: A Personal History of America's Radical Right (2013)
 The Longue Durée of the Far-Right: An International Historical Sociology (2014)
 Women of the Right: Comparisons and Interplay Across Borders (2015)
 The World of the John Birch Society: Conspiracy, Conservatism, and the Cold War (2015)
 John Birch: A Life (2016)
 The FBI and Religion: Faith and National Security Before and After 9/11 (2017)
 Hayek: A Collaborative Biography: Part XI: Orwellian Rectifiers, Mises’ ‘Evil Seed' of Christianity and the ‘Free’ Market Welfare State (2018)
 Right-Wing Populism in America: Too Close for Comfort (2018)
 A Threat of the First Magnitude: FBI Counterintelligence & Infiltration From the Communist Party to the Revolutionary Union 1962-1974 (2018)
 The Broadcast 41: Women and the Anti-Communist Blacklist (2018)
 Bad Faith: Teachers, Liberalism, and the Origins of McCarthyism (2019)
 Conspiracies of Conspiracies: How Delusions Have Overrun America (2019)
 Teaching Anticommunism: Fred Schwarz and American Postwar Conservatism (2020)
 Nixon's War at Home: The FBI, Leftist Guerrillas, and the Origins of Counterterrorism (2021)
 Post-Cold War Revelations and the American Communist Party: Citizens, Revolutionaries, and Spies (2021)
 The Spy Who Would Be Tsar: The Mystery of Michal Goleniewski and the Far-Right Underground (2021)
 American Psychosis: A Historical Investigation of How the Republican Party Went Crazy (2022)
 A Conspiratorial Life: Robert Welch, the John Birch Society, and the Revolution of American Conservatism (2022)
 Gossip Men: J. Edgar Hoover, Joe McCarthy, Roy Cohn, and the Politics of Insinuation (2022)
 Heavy Radicals: The FBI's Secret War on America's Maoists 2ED: The Revolutionary Union / Revolutionary Communist Party 1968-1980 (2022)
In his 2016 book John Birch: A Life, author Terry Lautz wrote, "Ernie Lazar introduced me to important documents on the John Birch Society...  Ernie Lazar has obtained and posted hundreds of Federal Bureau of Investigation (FBI) documents on the JBS (including many newspaper articles) through the Freedom of Information Act."

References

External sources
 Ernie Lazar FBI files
 Archive.org:
 @ernie1241
 Ernie Lazar FOIA Collection
 Ernie Lazar FOIA Collection: General Files A-Z
 Ernie Lazar FOIA Collection: FBI Files
 Guide to the Ernie Lazar FBI FOIA Files on Anti-Communism and Right Wing Movements TAM.576 (NYU Tamiment Library)
 Ernie Lazar FOIA Collection (H-Net)
 Ernie's Lazar's extensive bibliography of academic theses and PhD dissertations on the American Right (Berkley Center for Right-Wing Studies)

1945 births
2022 deaths
People from Minneapolis
American archivists